Qanchis Kancha (Quechua qanchis seven, kancha corral, "seven corrals", also spelled Kanchis Kancha, Kanchiskancha) is a mountain in the Bolivian Andes which reaches a height of approximately . It is located in the Potosí Department, José María Linares Province, Caiza "D" Municipality. The K'illi Mayu originates east of the mountain. It flows to the Uqururu Mayu in the northeast.

References 

Mountains of Potosí Department